Ntuthuko Mchunu (born 5 April 1999) is a South African rugby union player for the  in the Pro 14 Rainbow Cup SA. His regular position is prop.

Mchunu attended high school at Maritzburg College in Pietermaritzburg, where he was Head Boy in his Matric year of 2018.

Mchunu was named in the Sharks squad for the Pro14 Rainbow Cup SA competition.

References

External links
 

South African rugby union players
Rugby union players from Durban
Living people
1999 births
Rugby union props
Sharks (rugby union) players
Sharks (Currie Cup) players
Alumni of Maritzburg College
South Africa international rugby union players